Statistics of Guam League in the 2002 season.

Overview
Guam Shipyard won the championship.

References
RSSSF

Guam Soccer League seasons
Guam
Guam
football